The 1968 Christchurch mayoral election was part of the New Zealand local elections held that same year. In 1968, election were held for the Mayor of Christchurch plus other local government positions. The polling was conducted using the standard first-past-the-post electoral method.

Background
Sitting mayor George Manning retired leaving an open field to succeed him. The election saw councillor Ron Guthrey of the Citizens' Association defeat former Labour councillor and MP for Avon John Mathison. Labour lost ground on the city council as well, losing four seats leaving the composition of the council at three seats to sixteen in favour of the Citizens' Association.

Mayoralty results
The following table gives the election results:

Councillor results

References

Mayoral elections in Christchurch
1968 elections in New Zealand
Politics of Christchurch
October 1968 events in New Zealand
1960s in Christchurch